Hunter Street Park is a public, urban park in Apex, North Carolina. Located at 1250 Ambergate Station in Apex, the park is a short distance from downtown Apex and is directly across from the Apex Town Hall.

The  park contains a softball/baseball field, a soccer field, a multi-age playground, and an asphalt walking trail. It is also home to the city's dog parks.

References

Apex, North Carolina
Urban public parks
Dog parks in the United States
Parks in Wake County, North Carolina
Tourist attractions in Apex, North Carolina